Farsajin or Farsijin or Farsagin or Farsejin or Farsjin or Parsadzhin may refer to:

Farsejin, Hamadan
Farsajin, Qazvin